Through Art – to Peace and Understanding  is an award made in Belarus to people of culture and arts, artistic groups or organizations who have made significant contribution to international cultural cooperation, promoting the achievements and examples of world culture based on humanistic ideals and values.

The award is presented by the President of Belarus or its authorized officer on the opening ceremony of the International Art Festival "Slavianski Bazaar in Vitebsk".

Recipients
2005 - Andrey Petrov 
2006 - Alla Pugacheva
2007 - Sofia Rotaru
2008 - Aleksandra Pakhmutova
2009 - Valery Leontiev
2010 - Vladimir Mulyavin and Pesniary
2011 - Igor Luchenok                       
2012 - Lev Leshchenko      
2013 - Edita Piekha
2014 - Nadezhda Babkina
2015 - Polad Bülbüloğlu
2016 - Michael Finberg and  Belarusian State Philharmonic and the Concert Orchestra
2017 - Tamara Gverdtsiteli 
2018 - Roza Rymbayeva
2019 - Taisia Povaliy
2020 - Philipp Kirkorov
2021 - Nikolay Baskov

The names of the award winners are immortalized on the “Walk of Fame” near the amphitheater.

External links
 The "Walk of Fame" in Slavianski Bazaar website

Orders, decorations, and medals of Belarus
Belarusian awards
Awards established in 2005
2005 establishments in Belarus